The Ganale Doria River (also transliterated as Genale Dorya) is a perennial river in southeastern Ethiopia. Rising in the mountains east of Aleta Wendo, the Ganale flows south and east to join with the Dawa at the border with Somalia to become the Jubba. The river's tributaries include the Welmel, Weyib (also known as Gestro), Dumale, Doya, Hawas and the Hambala. The Del Verme Falls is a notable feature of its middle course.

The catchment area is estimated as having the potential to irrigate , and to generate 9270 gigawatt-hours per year.

The river Ganale was renamed Ganale Doria by the Italian explorer Vittorio Bottego after the Italian biologist Giacomo Doria.

The Genale Doria is historically important because it served as the boundary between Sidamo and Bale Provinces. The confluence of the Ganale Doria with the Dawa is notable as the starting point for the boundary between Ethiopia and Kenya to the west, and the starting point for the boundary between Ethiopia and Somalia to the east. The Battle of Genale Doria was fought to the south of its course.

Notes 

Jubba River
Bale Mountains
Ethiopian Highlands
Geography of Oromia Region
Important Bird Areas of Ethiopia